Emmanuel Kabongo (born December 25, 1986) is a Canadian actor and producer. Born and raised in Zaire before it became the Democratic Republic of the Congo, Kabongo immigrated to Canada with his family in the 1990s. He began his acting career as an extra before achieving recognition for his performance as the lead protagonist in the acclaimed web series Teenagers (2014–2017), for which he earned his first Canadian Screen Award nomination.

Kabongo is also known for his performances in film and television, including roles on the CBC Television series 21 Thunder (2017) and Frankie Drake Mysteries (2017–2018) and in feature films such as The Animal Project (2013), Antibirth (2016), and Brown Girl Begins (2017). He played a gladiator in Paul W. S. Anderson's Pompeii (2014) and has guest-starred in series such as Murdoch Mysteries (2013) and Star Trek: Discovery (2020).

Kabongo earned additional Canadian Screen Award nominations 2022 and 2023, for his performances in the television film Death She Wrote, and in the web series Chateau Laurier.

Early life 
Kabongo was born and raised in Lubumbashi, a city in Zaire (now known as the Democratic Republic of the Congo). He later relocated with his family to South Africa during the war. He has four brothers, including basketball player Myck Kabongo, and one sister. In the 1990s, Kabongo immigrated to Toronto with his family. Kabongo's father often worked as an extra in film and television.

During school, Kabongo played competitive basketball; he later turned down a basketball scholarship from the University of New Brunswick to pursue acting. Kabongo struggled with scoliosis in his youth. Before he started acting, Kabongo worked several jobs, including at a daycare, a Foot Locker, at the Canadian National Exhibition, and vacuuming floors and cleaning toilets at a train station.

Career 
Kabongo began acting in 2009, appearing in a little seen short film. He subsequently worked as an extra on the television series Nikita and Flashpoint. One of Kabongo's early background actor jobs was on the hit 2004 film Mean Girls.Kabongo's first role in a full-length feature film came in 2013 with the release of The Animal Project, directed by Ingrid Veninger. The film premiered at the Toronto International Film Festival and received generally positive reviews.

Throughout the 2010s, Kabongo guest-starred in a variety of television programs, including Call Me Fitz (2012), Murdoch Mysteries (2013), Rookie Blue (2013–2014), and Quantico (2015). He completed an actor's residency at Norman Jewison's Canadian Film Centre in 2015.

In 2014, Kabongo portrayed a gladiator in Paul W. S. Anderson's romantic historical disaster film Pompeii. The film won the Academy of Canadian Cinema and Television's Golden Screen Award for 2014 as the year's top-grossing Canadian film.

Alongside filmmaker M. H. Murray, Kabongo co-produced the first season of the web series Teenagers. In 2013, Murray approached Kabongo with the scripts and asked him to help produce the series; they subsequently cast the rest of the characters together using only actors from Toronto. Louis Chunovic of Playback published a piece on the series, writing that "the young creators of Teenagers had to have plenty of luck, pluck, talent, and grit to get this far. And that portends a Hollywood ending". Kabongo also starred as the lead male protagonist in the series. Teenagers received positive reviews from critics and was frequently compared to the Degrassi franchise and the UK television series Skins. The series amassed more than 10 million combined views on YouTube over the course of three seasons, from 2014 to 2017. For his performance in the second season of Teenagers, Kabongo earned his first Canadian Screen Award nomination.

In 2016, Kabongo produced and starred in A Man's Story, a short film for which he received funding from bravoFACT. The short film premiered at the ReelWorld Film Festival. That year, he also played a supporting role in Antibirth, which premiered at the Sundance Film Festival and was released on September 2, 2016 in the U.S., by IFC Midnight.

In September 2016, CBC announced it had commissioned a one-hour drama series that follows the star players of an under-21 soccer academy in Montreal, titled 21 Thunder, with Kabongo slated to star as one of the lead characters, an Ivory Coast mid-fielder named Junior Lolo. The series premiered in Canada on July 31, 2017, to generally positive reviews. Also that year, Kabongo appeared in three episodes of the CBC series Frankie Drake Mysteries as a boxer named Moses, and he starred opposite Mouna Traoré in Brown Girl Begins, a post-apocalyptic science fiction film directed by Sharon Lewis.

In 2020, he starred in an episode of the CBS All Access series Star Trek: Discovery as V’Kir. That year, he also played a supporting role in the Canadian political comedy film Québexit, which premiered at the Cinéfest Sudbury International Film Festival in September 2020.

Kabongo received a second Canadian Screen Award nomination in 2022, for his leading performance in the television film Death She Wrote. He received a third nomination in 2023 for this supporting performance in the web series Chateau Laurier.

Upcoming projects 
In 2022, Kabongo was cast in two feature films: Christina Cooper’s superhero film, Rising 6, and April Mullen’s sci-fi thriller, Hello Stranger.

Influences 
Kabongo found early acting inspiration in action films from the 1990s that his mother showed him as a child. In an interview with CBC Arts, Kabongo said that "taking acting serious came from watching how my mom reacted to films of the '90s ... [She] loves Denzel, Van Damme, Sylvester Stallone... My mom watched all those movies growing up, and knowing how that made her feel, I just wanted to do the same thing for her."

Kabongo has also cited Leonardo DiCaprio, Tom Hardy, Mahershala Ali, Viola Davis, and Daniel Day-Lewis as acting inspirations.

Personal life 
Kabongo was active during the protests following the police murder of George Floyd in summer 2020. In an interview with Harry Rosen, he said that "it’s important to me as a Black man to stand up for what is right, supporting the cause against police brutality."

Kabongo became engaged to his girlfriend, Raquel Melnichuk, in December 2021.

Accolades

Filmography

Film

Television

References

External links 
 

Living people
21st-century Canadian male actors
Canadian male film actors
Canadian male television actors
Canadian male web series actors
Democratic Republic of the Congo emigrants to Canada
1986 births
Canadian Film Centre alumni